Derick Omar Sequeira Lara (born 20 January 1996) is a Canadian-born Nicaraguan footballer who plays as a midfielder.

Career 
Sequeira played with TFC Academy II in 2012 in the Second Division of the Canadian Soccer League.

International career
Sequeira was born in Canada to Nicaraguan parents. He was a youth international for Canada. He was formally capped by the Nicaragua national football team in a friendly 3–0 loss to Guatemala on 14 August 2014.

References

1996 births
Living people
Soccer players from Mississauga
Canadian people of Nicaraguan descent
People with acquired Nicaraguan citizenship
Canadian men's soccer players
Nicaraguan men's footballers
Association football midfielders
Canada men's youth international soccer players
Nicaragua international footballers
Canadian Soccer League (1998–present) players